The Micronesian starling (Aplonis opaca) is a species of starling in the family Sturnidae. It is found in Micronesia, the Northern Mariana Islands, and Palau. Its natural habitats are subtropical or tropical dry forest and subtropical or tropical moist lowland forest.

Micronesian starlings consume fruit, seeds, the occasional insect and the eggs of seabirds. They are bold around humans and will follow humans in seabird colonies to take the eggs of seabirds flushed by them.

References

Micronesian starling
Birds of Micronesia
Micronesian starling
Taxa named by Heinrich von Kittlitz
Taxonomy articles created by Polbot